Limerick is a village in the Canadian province of Saskatchewan within the Rural Municipality of Stonehenge No. 73 and Census Division No. 3. The village is about 150 km (94 mi) north of the US border near the towns of Lafleche and Gravelbourg.  The village is named after the Irish city of Limerick.

History 
Limerick incorporated as a village on July 10, 1913.

Demographics 

See also

List of communities in Saskatchewan
Limerick, Ontario

References

Villages in Saskatchewan
Stonehenge No. 73, Saskatchewan
Division No. 3, Saskatchewan